The name siskin when referring to a bird is derived from an adaptation of the German dialect words sisschen, zeischen, which are diminutive forms of Middle High German (zîsec) and Middle Low German (ziseke, sisek) words, which are themselves apparently of Slavic origin. The  name siskin was first recorded in written English in 1562, referring to the Eurasian siskin, Spinus spinus.

Spinus
 Andean siskin, Spinus spinescens
 Antillean siskin, Spinus dominicensis
 Black siskin, Spinus atratus
 Black-capped siskin, Spinus atriceps
 Black-chinned siskin, Spinus barbatus
 Black-headed siskin, Spinus notatus
 Eurasian siskin, Spinus spinus
 Hooded siskin, Spinus magellanicus
 Olivaceous siskin, Spinus olivaceus
 Pine siskin, Spinus pinus
 Red siskin, Spinus cucullatus
 Saffron siskin, Spinus siemiradzkii
 Thick-billed siskin, Spinus crassirostris
 Yellow-bellied siskin, Spinus xanthogastrus
 Yellow-faced siskin, Spinus yarrellii
 Yellow-rumped siskin, Spinus uropygialis

Crithagra and Serinus
 Cape siskin, Crithagra totta
 Drakensberg siskin, Crithagra symonsi
 Ethiopian siskin, Serinus nigriceps

References

External links
Siskin videos, photos and sounds on the Internet Bird Collection

Bird common names
Finches
German words and phrases
Slavic words and phrases